Zapata is a Spanish surname. Notable people with the surname include:

Antonio Zapata y Cisneros (1550–1635), Spanish Roman Catholic bishop
Argiro Zapata (born 1971), Colombian road racing cyclist
Bernabé Zapata Miralles (born 1997), Spanish tennis player
Carmen Zapata (1927–2014), American actress
Claudia E. Zapata, Chicana artist
Cristián Zapata (born 1986), Colombian footballer
Duván Zapata (born 1991), Colombian footballer
Emiliano Zapata (1879–1919), Mexican revolutionary
Franky Zapata (born 1978), French personal watercraft inventor
Hansel Zapata (born 1995), Colombian footballer
Hilario Zapata (born 1958), Panamanian boxer
Javier de Jesús Zapata (born 1969), Colombian road racing cyclist
Javier Farinós, full name Francisco Javier Farinós Zapata (born 1978), Spanish footballer
José Antonio Zapata (painter) (1762–1837), Spanish painter
Karen Zapata (born 1982), Peruvian world chess champion
Marcos Zapata (c. 1710-1773), Peruvian painter
Mario Zapata Vinces (1920–unknown), Peruvian chess player
Maria Idalia Zapata (born 1946), Colombian chess master
Mesías Zapata (born 1981), Ecuadorian race walker
Mia Zapata (1965–1993), American musician
Orlando Zapata (1967–2010), Cuban human rights activist
Pedro León Zapata (1929–2015), Venezuelan cartoonist
Róbinson Zapata (born 1978), Colombian footballer
Rodolfo Zapata (born 1966), Argentine footballer and football manager
Rodolfo Zapata (singer) (1932–2019), Argentine singer-songwriter and actor
Víctor Zapata (born 1979), Argentine footballer
Víctor Zapata (born 1994), Colombian footballer
Fictional characters:
Marcos Zapata, the alter-ego of the superhero Relámpago

Spanish-language surnames